A serapeum is a temple or other religious institution dedicated to the syncretic Greco-Egyptian deity Serapis, who combined aspects of Osiris and Apis in a humanized form that was accepted by the Ptolemaic Greeks of Alexandria.  There were several such religious centers, each of which was a serapeion or, in its Latinized form, a serapeum. An Egyptian name for the temple of Osiris-Apis was Pr-Wsỉr-Ḥp "House of Osiris-Apis".

Egyptian serapea

Alexandria

The Serapeum of Alexandria in the Ptolemaic Kingdom was an ancient Greek temple built by Ptolemy III Euergetes. There are also signs of Harpocrates. It has been referred to as the daughter of the Library of Alexandria. It existed until the end of the fourth century AD.

Saqqara
The Serapeum of Saqqara is located north west of the Pyramid of Djoser at Saqqara, a necropolis near Memphis in Lower Egypt. It was a burial place of the Apis, sacred bulls that were incarnations of Ptah. It was believed that the bulls became immortal after death as Osiris-Apis, a name shortened to Serapis in the Hellenic period.

Canopus
Another serapeum was located at Canopus, in the Nile Delta near Alexandria. This sanctuary, dedicated to Isis and her consort Serapis, became one of the most famous cult centers of the Ptolemaic Kingdom and Roman Egypt. Its festivals and rites were so popular that the site became an architectural model for sanctuaries to the Egyptian gods throughout the Roman Empire.

At this Graeco-Roman site, a sacred temenos enclosed the temple dedicated to the gods, which was located behind a propylaea or peristyle court.  Auxiliary shrines dedicated to other, less universal, Egyptian deities could be found here as well, including those dedicated to Anubis (Hermanubis), Hermes Trismegistus, the syncretism of Thoth and Hermes, Harpocrates, and others.  Ritual complexes dedicated to Isis were often built around a well or a spring, which was meant to represent the miraculous annual inundation of the Nile.  This was also the case in sanctuaries devoted to the Egyptian gods in Roman-era Delos, where a central basin provided the water element central in the rites of Isis.

Serapea in Italy

Regio tertia
The Regio III within the city of Rome was named Isis et Serapis because it contained a temple dedicated to the two Egyptian deities. The structure, originally dedicated to Isis alone, was built by Quintus Caecilius Metellus Pius in the first half of the 1st century BCE to celebrate his father's victory over Jugurtha.

The complex, of which only parts of the foundations remain, was originally terraced; during the Flavian dynasty, it underwent major renovations, and the cult of Serapis was associated to that of Isis. The temple was finally demolished during the 6th century.

Campus Martius

This temple, dedicated to Isis and Serapis, was first dedicated by the triumvirs in 43 BCE in Rome. However, due to later tensions between Octavian (later Augustus Caesar) and Marc Antony, the temple was not built. Following the Battle at Actium, Augustus banned the religion from within the pomerium of Rome altogether. The temple was finally built by Gaius Caligula on the area known as Campus Martius, between the Saepta Julia and the temple of Minerva c. 37–41 CE.

The centre of the square was likely occupied by the temple dedicated to Isis, while the third section, a semicircular exedra with an apse presumably hosted the altar dedicated to Serapis. Fragments of the obelisks, some quite large, have been found around the current church of Santa Maria sopra Minerva; some archaeologists have proposed that the obelisk facing the Pantheon (see picture) may have been repositioned from the temple to its current location.

The building was destroyed in the great fire of the year 80 CE and rebuilt by Domitian; further renovation was initiated by Hadrian, while Septimius Severus ordered the necessary upkeep of the temple's structure. Written records attest to the Serapeum's existence and ritual activity until the 5th century.

Quirinal Hill

The temple built on Quirinal Hill and dedicated to Serapis was, by most surviving accounts, the most sumptuous and architectonically ambitious of those built on the hill; its remains are still visible between Palazzo Colonna and the Pontifical Gregorian University.

It was composed by a long courtyard (surrounded by a colonnade) and by the ritual area, where statues and obelisks had been erected.

Hadrian's Villa

Protected by a monumental dome, the sanctuary was composed of a public area and a more intimate subterranean part that was dedicated to the chthonic aspect of Serapis.

To mark the inauguration of his temple, Hadrian struck coinage that carry his effigy accompanied by Serapis, upon a dais where two columns support a round canopy. In this manner, the emperor became synnaos, a companion of the god's arcane naos and equal beneficiary of the cult of Serapis at Canopus.

In February 2021, archaeologists led by researcher Rafael Hidalgo Prieto from the Pablo de Olavide University announced the discovery of remains of Hadrian's breakfast room which used to show his imperial power. They revealed a structure as a water triclinium and a separate dining room that served as a model for the well-known Serapeum in his villa.

Ostia Antica

The Serapeum of Ostia Antica was inaugurated in 127 CE and dedicated to the syncretic cult of Jupiter Serapis.

It is a typical Roman sanctuary, on a raised platform and with a row of columns at the entrance, where a mosaic representing Apis in a typically Egyptian manner can still be seen.  From this temple likely came the statue that Bryaxis copied for the Serapeum in Alexandria.

Pozzuoli
The Macellum of Pozzuoli, marketplace or macellum of the Roman city of Puteoli (now known as Pozzuoli) was first excavated in the 18th century, when the discovery of a statue of Serapis led to the building being misidentified as the city's serapeum, the Temple of Serapis. Under that name, the site had considerable influence on early geology as a band of boreholes affecting the three standing columns suggested that the building had been partly below sea level for some period.

Serapea in Tunisia 
A Latin inscription and other archaeological finds including statues, busts and other objects indicating the presence of a Serapeum from the Roman period in Carthage, dedicated to the Egyptian deities Isis and Serapis.

Serapea in Turkey

Pergamon 
Inside  Pergamon in Bergama, there is the Temple of Serapis, built for the Egyptian gods in the 2nd century CE and called the Red Basilica (Kızıl Avlu in Turkish) by locals. This is a basilica-shaped building constructed under the reign of Hadrian. It consists of a main building and two round towers. In the Christian New Testament, the Church at Pergamon, inside the main building of the Red Basilica, is listed as one of the Seven Churches to which the Book of Revelation was addressed (Revelation 2:12).

Ephesus 
Another serapeum was in Ephesus, which is near present-day Selçuk, İzmir Province, Turkey. The temple is located behind the Library of Celsus. This Egyptian temple was turned into a Christian church.

Miletus 
This temple was built in the 3rd century BCE near the south agora of Miletus and also it was restored by Emperor Julius Aurelius (270–275 CE).

References

Alexandria
Chuvin, Pierre, 1990 (B. A. Archer, translator). A Chronicle of the Last Pagans,(Harvard University Press).  The incremental restrictions on "indigenous polytheism" of the governing class, chronicled from imperial edict to imperial edict.
MacMullen, Ramsay, 1984.Christianizing the Roman Empire A.D. 100-400, (Yale University Press).
Turcan, Robert, (1992) 1996. Cults of the Roman Empire  (Blackwell). A translation of Les cultes orientaux dans le monde romain.

Saqqara
Christophe, B. (2001). L'inscription dédicatoire de Khâemouaset au Sérapéum de Saqqara (Pl. V-XIII). Revue d'Égyptologie, 52, 29-55.

Ostia
Mar, R. (1992). El serapeum ostiense y la urbanística de la ciudad. Una aproximación a su estudio. BA, 13(15), 31-51.
Bloch, H. (1959). The Serapeum of Ostia and the Brick-Stamps of 123 AD A New Landmark in the History of Roman Architecture. American Journal of Archaeology, 63(3), 225-240.
Mar, R. (2001). El santuario de Serapis en Ostia.
Mols, S. (2007). The Urban Context of the Serapeum at Ostia. Babesch, 82(1), 227-232.

Rome
 Filippo Coarelli, "Iseum et Serapeum in Campo Martio; Isis Campensis", in E. M. Steinby (ed.), Lexicon Topographicum Urbis Romae (LTUR), vol. 3, 1996, pp. 107–109.
 Filippo Coarelli, "I monumenti dei culti orientali a Roma", in La soteriologia dei culti orientali nell'Impero romano, Leiden, Brill, 1982, pp. 33–67..
 Serena Ensoli, "I santuari di Iside e Serapide a Roma e la resistenza pagana in età tardoantica" in Aurea Roma, Roma, L'Erma di Bretschneider, 2000, pp.  273-282..

Pozzuoli
Charles Dubois. Cultes et dieux à Pouzzoles. Roma, 1902.
Charles Dubois. Pouzzoles Antique. Parigi, 1907.

External links

Rufinus – "The Destruction of the Serapeum A.D. 391"
Michael Routery, "The Serapeum of Alexandria" The author has conflated material from his cited references source (R. Turcan 1996:126): the reason for the conflict that led to the barricading in the Serapeum has been changed from that of his source. Here it is the finding of human skulls and the charge of human sacrifice text instead of a conspiracy and a ridiculing of art work.
Richard Stillwell, ed. Princeton Encyclopedia of Classical Sites, 1976: "Alexandria, Egypt: Serapeion"
References to another Serapeum near the Suez Canal:
Eastern Serapeum2 - To the west of Tussum a large group of dunes occurs which runs to the south-south-west, and at kilometer 90 we reach the Serapeum.
Eastern Serapeum3 - On Napoleon's Map
Three more Serapea - The Tabula Peutingeriana shows 3 additional Serapea not discussed in the article (Big Map)

 
3rd-century BC architecture
Hellenistic architecture
Egyptology
Serapis
Ptolemaic Alexandria